Orla E. Watson (June 3, 1896 – January 17, 1983) was an American inventor, engineer, and draftsman. He is most remembered for his invention of the rear swinging door feature on grocery shopping carts allowing the cart to telescope, or "nest" in order to save space.

Watson was a World War I veteran and had a number of jobs including machinist, draftsman, and foreman. Watson experimented with his various ideas on the side, including the development of a Model T timer to replace the stock electrical device on Model T automobiles. In 1933, he opened a business making air conditioners. In 1946, Watson opened Western Machine Co., a machine shop and contract manufacturing business.

In 1946, Watson made a prototype of his new cart and presented it to a group of 10 grocery store owners in the Kansas City area. One of those present during the presentation was local grocery store owner Fred E. Taylor who was impressed with the design and would later become co-founder of Telescope Carts, Inc. George O'Donnell, a salesman from Oak Park, Illinois would also join the company. Watson's design was a major improvement to those previous to the introduction of the telescope cart. Orla Watson was granted a patent #2,479,530 on August 16, 1949 for the "Telescope Cart" which could be "nested" together in order to save space without disassembly after each use. Up to that point, the most common design in use at grocery stores within the United States was based on a "folding chair" and removable basket design introduced by Sylvan Goldman. Watson's work on the evolution of the shopping cart forms the basis of all subsequent designs up to the present.

Watson also developed the power-lift shopping cart to raise the lower basket of the two-basket design to assist in the retrieval of items while at the checkout counter. Only a few of the power-lift designs were produced. The patent application was abandoned and never granted.

Watson also applied for and was granted four patents prior to the telescoping shopping cart. These patents included improvements to mechanical valves, pumps, and gauges, none of which were ever licensed or manufactured.

References

External links
 Newsdesk.si.edu
 Amhistory.si.edu
 Designboom.com
 Americanprofile.com

20th-century American engineers
1890s births
1983 deaths
20th-century American inventors